4RO is an AM radio station broadcasting to Central Queensland from Rockhampton, Queensland on 990 kHz.

History
The station was launched on 2 July 1932 and was the second station in Rockhampton - the first being 4RK, now ABC Capricornia. The opening of 4RO resulted in Rockhampton being the first regional town in Queensland, to have two radio stations on the air.

Coverage of races and football were among the first items to be featured on 4RO's earliest transmissions on 2 July 1932.  The station was officially opened that night by Rockhampton Mayor, JT Lee.

4RO's first studio was built on the corner of East and Denham Streets in Rockhampton's CBD. The studio was on the second floor of the building. An aerial that strung between two masts on the back of the building was responsible for transmitting a power of 200 watts.

In 1953, new transmitters of two kilowatts were built at Pink Lily, on the outskirts of Rockhampton and two years later 4RO moved into new studios in East Street, in a building that became known as Rheuben House. Rheuben House was the home to 4RO until 1970 when a new building designed by architects from Toowoomba were constructed on the corner of Archer Street and Victoria Parade.

The Victoria Parade studio was officially opened by Rockhampton Mayor Rex Pilbeam on 18 August 1970. In 1982, 4RO opened a new transmission site at Port Alma, south of Rockhampton, that started transmitting a power of five kilowatts. The old transmitter at Pink Lily is now used by 4RO's Gladstone based sister station 4CC to broadcast their Rockhampton service on 1584 AM.  In 1979, 4RO employed a staff of 24 employees.

In 1996, 4RO was bought by Reg Grundy's RG Capital Radio.

After successfully bidding for an FM licence, RG Capital launched an FM radio station in Rockhampton called Sea FM, which was added to RG Capital's existing network of Sea FM stations across Queensland and New South Wales. The new Sea FM studios were set up inside the 4RO building in Victoria Parade.  The original intention for the creation of Sea FM was to use it as a sister-station to 4RO enabling the two stations to cater for two different age demographics with 4RO's programming slightly changed for an older audience, while Sea FM offered a more youth orientated format to attract younger listeners.

When 4RO welcomed its new sister station, DMG Regional Radio also launched Hot FM.  Hot FM was also a youth-orientated station, designed to attract the younger listeners that didn't listen to DMG's AM station in Gladstone, 4CC.  Unlike 4CC which had its studio in Gladstone, DMG established the Hot FM studios in Rockhampton to broadcast a local breakfast show and to emphasise the rivalry between the two new FM stations who were both fighting to attract a similar demographic.

However, in 2004, RG Capital Radio and DMG Regional Radio merged to form Macquarie Regional RadioWorks, which meant all four local commercial stations found themselves owned by the same company. The merger meant that the newly formed company was required by Australian law to offload two radio stations, due to a legal requirement stipulating that one media company cannot own more than two radio stations in the same market.  Macquarie Regional Radioworks eventually offloaded 4RO and 4CC to Prime Media Group. Prime also acquired a number of other regional stations after similar events occurred in other regional radio markets, including Cairns, Townsville, Mackay, and the Sunshine Coast.

Despite now under different ownership, 4RO shared the Victoria Parade studios with Sea FM until August 2007, when 4RO moved into the office vacated by Hot FM when they moved their local studio to Gladstone at the beginning of 2005.  4RO's new Quay Street studios, also incorporating a sales office for 4CC, were officially opened by Rockhampton Mayor Margaret Strelow in November 2007.

In August 2013 Grant Broadcasters acquired the station and Prime Media's other nine radio stations in Queensland.  As a result, the 4RO studio in Rockhampton now serves as a sales office for Grant's KIX Country narrowcasting service.

In November 2021, 4RO, along with other stations owned by Grant Broadcasters, were acquired by the Australian Radio Network. This deal will allow Grant's stations, including 4RO, to access ARN's iHeartRadio platform in regional areas. The deal was finalized on January 4, 2022.

Current Programming

Format
4RO's slogan is News, Talk and The Music You Love.  As the slogan suggests, the station currently has a varied format featuring a variety of talk and music programming.  The station's programming is skewed towards an older audience, especially the 45+ demographics.

Shows
The station's breakfast show with Michael J. Bailey, The Laurie Atlas show and the Saturday morning program are the only local shows produced from the Rockhampton studio.

The regionally-networked Retro 20/20 Countdown is hosted by Aaron Stevens. Retro 20/20 Countdown is heard on 4CA in Cairns, 4MK in Mackay, Gladstone's 4CC, Zinc 96.1 on the Sunshine Coast and River 94.9 Ipswich.

4RO also sources some programming from Macquarie Media  The Ray Hadley Morning Show, Nights with John Stanley, Roothys Australia, 2GB overnights and 2GB's Continuous Call Team rugby league coverage during the NRL season.

News
Sunshine Coast journalists compile and present news bulletins that air on 4RO during each weekday.  The station also uses the Macquarie National News service overnight and on weekends.  The news bulletins that air during the breakfast program are a composite of both national and local news.  Unlike Sea FM, Hot FM and ABC Capricornia, the station no longer airs bulletins that comprise only of local news stories.

Prior to 1998, 4RO had its own local newsroom in Rockhampton staffed with its own journalist.  The journalist compiled full local news bulletins that went to air hourly from 6:30am until 1pm, before a pre-recorded bulletin aired at 5pm.  In 1998, the newsroom at 4RO was closed when RG Capital transferred 4RO's journalist to the newly established newsroom at Gold FM on the Gold Coast, where the journalist continued to read local bulletins for 4RO but also began presenting national news bulletins for all of RG Capital's networks stations.

As part of the Gold Coast arrangement, the 9am, 10am, 11am and 1pm local news bulletins were axed, with local news only being read on 4RO during breakfast, midday and 5pm.  Gold Coast-based journalists continued to read local news bulletins for 4RO until Prime Media established its own newsroom on the Sunshine Coast and reduced local news output on 4RO even further, with the composite bulletins mixing local stories amongst national stories, only airing during the breakfast program between 6am and 9am.

When 4RO moved out of the building it shared with Sea FM in 2007, Southern Cross Austereo used 4RO's old studio to re-establish a local newsroom to use it for their own stations, Sea FM and Hot FM.  Ever since, Southern Cross Austereo has employed a Rockhampton-based journalist to broadcast a local news service similar to what 4RO had prior to 1998.

Controversies

Stolen Generations Apology
During a time when Australian Prime Minister John Howard was being called on to formerly apologise to the Stolen Generations, a 4RO listener anonymously sent a letter to the station which took the form of a mock, sarcastic apology entitled Australian Apology to the Aborigines.

On 7 April 2000, 4RO breakfast co-presenter Olivia Scott read the "apology" on air.

A complaint was then lodged with the station.  The unresolved complaint was then lodged with commercial radio's regulatory body, the Australian Broadcasting Authority prompting an investigation.  At the completion of the investigation, the ABA found 4RO had breached clause 1.3(c) of the Commercial Radio Codes of Practice by broadcasting material which was likely to vilify on the basis of race.

During the investigation, Olivia Scott was immediately suspended from all on-air duties but was re-instated on 8 May 2000 following the completion of the investigation on the condition that she personally apologise; the Human Rights & Equal Opportunity Commission was contacted by 4RO; an ongoing training program was implemented for all on air staff at 4RO; and at 4RO's instigation, a meeting was held on 2 May 2000 between representatives of Central Queensland's Indigenous community to discuss the issue.  Following the investigation, managing director of RG Capital Radio, Rhys Holleran also pre-recorded an apology which was aired at various intervals on 13 April 2000 and 14 April 2000.

After satisfying the ABA with the various proactive steps taken by the station following the incident, no action was taken was taken against 4RO despite the breach.

Scott's 4RO breakfast co-presenter James Ashby later said that watching Scott endure substantial media and public scrutiny during the investigation without being able to help was the lowest point of his radio career.

Morning Announcer Dispute
Former WIN Television newsreader Bruce Diamond was employed by 4RO in 2004 to host a new 10am-midday program called CQ Today.  4RO decided to employ Diamond as he was a well-known media identity in Central Queensland having read the local news from Rockhampton's RTQ studio for more than twenty years before finishing in late 2002.

In August 2005, Diamond received a letter from 4RO management requesting him to stop talking about certain things on air.  Diamond was instructed to stop talking about the local state member of parliament, Member for Rockhampton Robert Schwarten; Diamond's campaign calling for Rockhampton to receive an oncology unit at Rockhampton Hospital to limit long-distance travel for cancer patients; and 4RO's breakfast announcer Jeffrey Goodwin who Diamond claimed accepted a gift from Robert Schwarten (a cap) which Diamond described as unethical.

Diamond said he refused to be "gagged" and continued talking about the issues despite the request by management.

Schwarten said he had approached 4RO management for a "fair go" because Diamond had been criticising him on air for seven months, and claimed Diamond had gone too far when he involved Schwarten's wife and son.  Diamond refuted the claim and invited Schwarten to submit any evidence to show how he had involved his family.

In late January 2006, 4RO axed CQ Today and shortened the breakfast program by an hour when the station decided to take the nationally syndicated John Laws Morning Show from 2UE in Sydney between 9am and midday each day.  Diamond said he had "heated discussions" with 4RO management when he was fired when he concluded what turned out to be his last program on 27 January 2006.  Diamond also claimed he was considering legal action, claiming 4RO had told him that they wanted him to host a new afternoon drive program on 4RO.  Diamond also said 4RO staff had threatened to call the police when he offered to drop by the radio station to pick up the mail that was addressed to him.

Notable Past Announcers
Since 4RO's inception in 1932, hundreds of announcers have worked at 4RO.

Among the more notable are controversial Pauline Hanson's One Nation political advisor, James Ashby; parenting and relations expert, Dr Justin Coulson; former Rockhampton Mayor, Jim McRae; renowned racecaller, Wayne Wilson; and former WIN Television presenters, Bruce Diamond and Gary Foale.
Chris Monahan who went on to be the youngest ever full-time day time metro radio announcer and winner of best newcomer of the year at the Radio awards

Ratings
On 29 September 2016, ratings for the Central Queensland radio market were released.  It was the first time since 2001 that ratings for the market had been calculated.  According to the ratings, 4RO performed best in the 65+ demographic with 16.9% audience share.  The most listened to timeslot on 4RO was the 7pm-midnight shift with 8.6% audience share.

References

Radio stations in Queensland
Radio stations established in 1932
Classic hits radio stations in Australia
Australian Radio Network